Timing is a 2014 South Korean animated film based on the webtoon of the same name by cartoonist Kang Full. The film was directed by Min Kyung-jo, and features the voices of Park Ji-yoon, Yoon Sang-hyun, Ryu Seung-gon, Yeo Min-jeong, Sim Gyu-hyuk and Sung Wan-kyung.

Plot

Once upon a time in a faraway land, there was a boy called Li Yam San. One day, he suddenly found a time machine. He bought a lottery ticket and won. There he bought drugs, girls, etc. But someone from the future kidnapped him. Witness what would happen next and watch it yourself.

Cast
 Park Ji-yoon as Park Ja-gi
 Ahn Jae-hyun as Kim Young-tak
 Ryu Seung-gon as Kang Min-hyuk
 Yeo Min-jeong as Jang Se-yoon
 Sim Gyu-hyuk as Baek Ki-hyung
 Sung Wan-kyung as Yang Sung-sik

Production
Production began in 2010.

Release
Originally scheduled to be released on 2012, the film was shelved for sponsorship reasons. It premiered at the 2014 Busan International Film Festival.

Awards and nominations

References

External links 
 
 
 
 Timing original webtoon at Daum 

2010s Korean-language films
2014 films
2014 animated films
2010s mystery films
2010s science fiction thriller films
South Korean animated science fiction films
South Korean mystery films
South Korean thriller films
Animated thriller films
Films about time travel
Films about time
Films about dreams
Films about psychic powers
South Korean high school films
Films based on South Korean webtoons
Films based on works by Kang Full
2010s high school films
2010s South Korean films